Marion Vaughn Shirley (April 17, 1922 – September 13, 1996) was an American football player who played at the tackle position. He played college football for Oklahoma City University and professional football for the New York Yankees.

Early years
Shirley was born in 1922 in Denver. He attended and played football at Classen High School in Oklahoma City.

College football and military service
He served in the United States Navy during World War II. After the war, he played college football for Oklahoma City University. He was a member of the 1946 Oklahoma City Chiefs football team that compiled a 10–1 record and the 1947 team that went 7–3.

Professional football
He was selected by the Boston Yanks in the 1947 NFL Draft and by the New York Yankees in the 1948 AAFC Draft.  He played for the Yankees during their 1948 and 1949 seasons. He appeared in a total of 19 games for the Yankees. He was sold to the Chicago Hornets in May 1949, but returned to the Yankees in 1950.

Family and later years
Shirley died in 1996 at age 74 in Stafford, Texas.

References

1922 births
1996 deaths
New York Yankees (AAFC) players
Oklahoma City Chiefs football players
Players of American football from Denver
American football tackles
United States Navy personnel of World War II